Col de la Joux Verte (el. 1760 m.) is a high mountain pass in the Alps in France. Both roads to it come from the resort of Morzine, allowing a round trip to be made. The ski station of Morzine-Avoriaz is nearby, which hosted Tour de France stage finishes in 1975, 1977, 1983, 1985, 1979, 1994, and 2010.

See also
 List of highest paved roads in Europe
 List of mountain passes

References 

Mountain passes of Auvergne-Rhône-Alpes
Mountain passes of the Alps